Lower North East Road (and its southwestern sections as North Terrace and Payneham Road) is an arterial road in the northeastern suburbs of Adelaide, South Australia. It links the north-eastern corner of Adelaide to Houghton in the Adelaide Hills, and is an urban alternative to North East Road.

Route
North Terrace starts on the eastern side of the City Ring Route in central Adelaide and heads east until the intersection with Fullarton and Magill Roads, where it becomes Payneham Road and continues northeast though Adelaide's eastern suburbs, crossing Portrush Road, until the intersection with Glynburn and Montacute Roads Road at Glynde, South Australia, where it continues northeast as Lower North East Road to Hope Valley, where it meets the eastern terminus of Grand Junction Road. It continues up a ridge of the Adelaide Hills through Houghton to eventually end at North East Road. Payneham and Lower North East Roads are initially on the south side of the River Torrens, mirrored by North East Road on its northern side.

Major intersections

See also

References 

Roads in Adelaide